Eduardo Horacio Laborde (19 October 1967 – 4 February 2015) was an Argentine rugby union player, who played three games for the national team Los Pumas in the 1991 Rugby World Cup.

Laborde died in February 2015 after the bicycle he was riding collided with another vehicle in the coastal town of Pinamar.

References

1967 births
2015 deaths
Rugby union players from Buenos Aires
Argentine rugby union players
Argentina international rugby union players
Rugby union centres
Cycling road incident deaths
Road incident deaths in Argentina